Goldtree Engine is a computer program published by Goldtree Enterprises in 1993 as a play aid for role-playing gamemasters. The second edition of the game was renamed The Goldtree Engine: Kingspoint.

Description
Goldtree Engine is a software program for the IBM PC designed to assist a gamemaster to run tabletop role-playing game adventures in a fantasy urban environment. Using the pre-programmed city Kingspoint, a medieval fantasy city of 150,000, the gamemaster can access the locations and descriptions of random encounters, magic items, buildings, businesses, and neighborhoods. The program can also track game time, create random events, generate changing weather conditions in game time, and provide random dice rolls.

Alternatively, the gamemaster can create their own city and store an index of locations, items and encounters.

Publication history
Computer programmer Luke Ahearn coded Goldtree Engine for IBM PC and compatible computers, and the program was subsequently published in 1993 by Goldtree Enterprises, based in Metairie, Louisiana. The following year, Goldtree released a second edition of the program retitled The Goldtree Engine: Kingspoint.

Reception
In the September 1994 edition of Dragon (Issue #209), Lester W. Smith was enthusiastic about Goldtree Engine, commenting "The things this program can do are amazing" in a lengthy review about its capabilities. He did point out a number of minor issues: he found the user's guide "less than perfect", he wanted faster access to non-player characters, and he found Kingspoint, the city included with the program, to be an overly dark place. He concluded by giving this program an excellent rating of 5 out of 6, saying, "It does all the dirty work, leaving the GM free to role-play. For city campaigning, there simply is no better GM aid."

In the October 1994 edition of Pyramid (Issue #9), Loyd Blankenship reviewed The Goldtree Engine: Kingspoint under the banner "Pyramid Pick: The Best in Gaming." He noted three different types of gamemasters who could use this game: those that lack the time to design their own city; those that need the gamemaster aids offered by the program; and those that would use the city information to add to their own campaigns when needed. He concluded with a strong recommendation, saying, "Overall, the Kingspoint software is a complete fantasy city ready for your characters, bug-free and fun to use."

Other reviews
Shadis #21 (Oct. 1995)

References

Role-playing game software